Rudeau-Ladosse is a commune in the Dordogne department in Nouvelle-Aquitaine in southwestern France.

Geography
The Lizonne river forms the commune's southern border. The ruisseau de Beaussac, a tributary of the Lizonne, forms the commune's southwestern border.

Population

See also
Communes of the Dordogne department

References

External links

Communes of Dordogne